Petitioning (literally "letters and visits") is the administrative system for hearing complaints and grievances from individuals in the People's Republic of China. It is the primary tool for dispute resolution in the country.

Origins
In ancient imperial times, petitioners were called "people with grievances". Petitioners who needed justice would come to the yamen of the county magistrate or high official and beat a drum to voice their grievances. As such, every official court was supposed to be equipped with a drum for this sole purpose. Sometimes petitioners would throw their bodies in front of a sedan chair of the high official. When no one else at the local level was able to help, petitioners would travel to the then empire's capital to seek higher official's help.

Petitioners in recent years sometimes search for justice through the legal system or local petitioning bureaus. However, those who feel that justice has eluded them often still travel to Beijing as a last resort to appeal to the rulers in the age-old manner.

System
The petitions can take many forms, including phone calls, faxes, visits or even e-mails to any government office with regard to any of the issues. Under the system, the National Public Complaints and Proposals Administration and local bureaus of letters and calls ("petitioning bureaus") are commissioned to receive letters, calls, and visits from individuals or groups on suggestions, complaints, and grievances. The officers then channel the issues to respective departments and monitor the progress of settlement, which they feedback to the filing parties.

Petitioning bureaus are ostensibly a communication channel between the government and the citizenry, and have been relied on since the establishment of the PRC in 1949. Petitioners may begin their attempts for redress at the local level with letters and calls to offices, which are located in courthouses or in township-level government offices. If unsatisfied, they can move up the hierarchy to provincial level offices and, at the highest level, the National Public Complaints and Proposals Administration in Beijing.

The number of petitioners in Beijing alone has allegedly reached more than 100,000 people, not counting those that remain at provincial capitals. The number of people using the petitioning system has increased since 1993, to the extent that the system has been strained for years. Official statistics indicate that petition offices annually handled around 10 million inquiries and complaints from petitioners from 2003 to 2007. However, despite its enduring nature and political support, the system has never been an effective mechanism for dealing with the complaints brought to it.

Issues

Interception

Provincial capitals have been accused of hiring people in Beijing to abduct petitioners who have travelled from their areas and force them to go back home; this is known as "intercepting." The apparent aim of interceptors is to prevent citizens from appealing in Beijing because local officials face reprisals if citizens from their areas seek redress in the capital.

Imprisonment and abuse
Human rights organizations have accused Chinese authorities of arbitrarily imprisoning large numbers of petitioners in black jails or other illicit detention facilities. In 2009, Human Rights Watch produced a report alleging that large numbers of petitioners, including children, are detained in black jails, and documented several allegations of torture and mistreatment in the facilities.

See also
Memorial to the throne, the equivalent petition under imperial China
Black jails
Clameur de haro; ombudsman
Weiquan movement

Notes

References

Bibliograph
Martin K. Dimitrov, Vertical Accountability in Communist Regimes: The Role of Citizen Complaints in Bulgaria and China

Politics of China
Human rights in China
Complaints organizations
Dispute resolution